Floyd Presbyterian Church is a historic Presbyterian church located on U.S. 221 in Floyd, Floyd County, Virginia.  It was built in 1850, and is a one-story, three bay, brick church in the Greek Revival style.  It has a front gable roof topped by a low steeple and octagonal spire.  The front facade features four white-painted stuccoed, Greek Doric order pilasters. The church was abandoned by its congregation in October, 1974, and the congregation relocated.

It was listed on the National Register of Historic Places in 1976.  It is located in the Floyd Historic District.

References

External links
Presbyterian Church of Floyd website

Churches completed in 1850
19th-century Presbyterian church buildings in the United States
Greek Revival church buildings in Virginia
Churches in Floyd County, Virginia
Churches on the National Register of Historic Places in Virginia
Presbyterian churches in Virginia
National Register of Historic Places in Floyd County, Virginia
Individually listed contributing properties to historic districts on the National Register in Virginia